doual'art is a non profit cultural organisation and art centre founded in 1991 in Douala, Cameroon and focussed on new urban practices of African cities.

History 
doual'art was registered as a non profit organization in 1992 and it was established by Marilyn Douala Bell and Didier Schaub. In 1995 they created Espace doual'art, an exhibition space and gallery in the neighbourhood of Bonanjo in Douala. In 1996 they produced La Nouvelle Liberté by Joseph-Francis Sumégné, considered a landmark in Douala. In 2005 they organized the first Ars&Urbis event, an international symposium to foster discussion and theory about the contribution of art to urban transformation. The event led to the establishment of the SUD Salon Urbain de Douala, a triennial exhibition focused on public art. In December 2007 it launched the first edition of the SUD Salon Urbain de Douala. 
In December 2010  the second edition of SUD Salon Urbain de Douala took place. The salon produces the itinerant exhibition Making Douala 2007-2013 which was presented in 2012 at the International Architecture Biennale Rotterdam within its official programme, at the Dakar Biennale as an off event and on Lucas Grandin's website 
 In 2013 it participated at Art Dubai doual'art by exhibiting the artists Em’kal Eyongakpa, Boris Nzebo and Joseph-Francis Sumégné and by representing the artists Romuald Dikoumé, Justine Gaga, Haco Hankson, Aser Kash, Koko Komégné, Salifou Lindou, Hervé Yamguen and Hervé Youmbi.

Governance 

doual'art is directed by its president Marilyn Douala Bell (and its artistic director Didier Schaub until his death in 2014). The institution is an independent non profit organization which develops its activities and projects with the support of partners, international grant-makers and sponsors.

In producing site-specific urban interventions, doual'art works as an intermediary between social and economic actors, population and local collectives. It perceives cultural and artistic initiatives as a tool for consolidating freedom of expression and social cohesion, which allow in their turn transcending and overcoming closures and cleavages. doual'art implements a participatory approach to cultural practice, negotiating with local communities, NGOs and authorities their specific needs and aspirations and involving artists as facilitators of the development processes.

The exhibition space has presented works by Pascale Marthine Tayou, Goddy Leye, Alioum Moussa, Koko Komégné, Joseph-Francis Sumégné, AchilleKà, Bili Bidjocka, Lucas Grandin, Khaled Hafez, Christian Hanussek, Aser Kash, Bill Kouelany, Frédéric Keiff, Faouzi Laatiris, Salifou Lindou, Michèle Magema, Malam, Joël Mpah Dooh, Younès Rahmoun, Tracey Rose, Kamiel Verschuren, Sue Williamson, Jules Wokam, Guy Wouete, Hervé Yamguen, Hervé Youmbi.

Building 
doual'art was initially established in 1991 without a fixed location, with the aim of producing site-specific artworks and projects in the different neighborhoods of Douala. In 1995 the Espace doual'art is created. The space was established in the former cinema of the Palace of Douala Kings, propriety of the family Douala Bell and located in Bonanjo, Place du Gouvernement. The architect Danièle Diwouta-Kotto restored the location and created offices, an exhibition space, a cafeteria and the outside garden. The Espace doual'art hosts meetings, conferences, exhibitions, projections, installations and performances. Douala is at the centre of the work of doual'art, also after the establishment of the Espace doual'art. Between 1991 and 2012 doual'art produces artworks in over 12 neighborhood of the city.

Programme 
The focus of doual'art is on contemporary art and urban transformations. 
Since 1991, the organization has exhibited and produced artworks of Cameroonian artists and it has invited contemporary artists of other nationalities to Douala in order to create a bridge between the city and contemporary art productions. The purpose of doual'art is to foster Douala's cultural and urban identity. Indeed, artistic creation is considered a trigger of change, a paradigm of development, and most crucially an effective means to fight indigence and poverty.
Since 2007 doual'art organises the SUD Salon Urbain de Douala, a triennial cultural event which produces ephemeral and permanent contemporary art and public art for the city of Douala. The event takes place in December; the first edition of SUD is organized in 2007; the second in 2010; the third in 2013.

Notability 

Doual'art is described by the Prince Claus Fund as an "organisation that has revolutionized the art scene in Cameroon". Doual'art is part of several international networks including Artfactories and ArtsCollaboratory.

 It is featured among the institutions of New Art Spaces Museum, The organisation and its activities have been supported among others by ICU Art Projects (since 2010), Enough Room for Space, Prince Claus Fund, Mondriaan Foundation, Hivos, ArtsCollaboratory - Doen Foundation.

See also 
 List of Cameroonian artists
 List of public art in Douala

References

Further reading 
  Emmanuelle Lequeux, A Douala, la princesse qui veut éveiller les consciences in "Le Monde", 14/03/2012.
  Essombe Mouange, Les arts plastiques au Cameroun, pour un espace d'expression viable in Cameroun: la culture sacrifiée. Dossier of the magazine "Africultures", n. 60, L'Harmattan, July–September 2004, pp. 84–93.
  Essombe Mouange, Nous voulons faire de Douala la capitale des arts plastique: entretien avec Marilyn Douala Bell et Didier Schaub in Cameroun: la culture sacrifiée. Dossier of the magazine "Africultures", n. 60, L'Harmattan, July–September 2004, pp. 94–95.
  "Revue Noire" - Special Issue on Cameroon, n. 13, 1994. Issue of the magazine focussed on Cameroon art scene (visual arts, literature, cinema, music and design). Talk memory also by Simon Njami, Doual'Art, Marilyn Douala-Bell, Didier Schaub.
  Thomas Boutoux et Cédric Vincent, Doual'art - Africa Remix Sampler in Africa Remix, Paris, Centre Pompidou, 2005, p. 255.
 Christian Hanoussek, Cameroon: An Emerging Art Scene in "Nka: Journal of Contemporary African Art", n. 13/14, Spring/Summer 2001, pp. 100–105.
  Dominique Malaquais, Quelle Liberté : Art, Beauty and the Grammars of Resistance in Douala in Beautiful/Ugly : African and diaspora aesthetics, (dir.) Sarah Nuttall, Duke University Press Library et Prince Claus Fund, Durham et The Hague, 2006, p. 122-163. The chapter specifically refer to the artwork La nouvelle liberté by Joseph-Francis Sumégné produced by doual'art and the dynamics of this production.
  Douala in Translation. A view of the city and its creative transformative potentials, edited by Doual'art and iStrike Foundation, Episode Publishers, Rotterdam, 2007. Essays about the work of doual'art produced independently by researchers and intellectuals. 
  Zayd Minty, The Freedom to Dream in "Art South Africa", V6.3., 03/2008. Article on specialized magazine about the work of doual'art in particular in the neighborhood of Bessengué. 
  Living As Form: Socially Engaged Art from 1991-2011, ed. Nato Thompson, MIT Press, 2012, p. 148. 
  Aya Bach / hw, Art and history are shaping Cameroon's future in DW Deutsche Welle, 03/09/2011.
  Abdoumaliq Simone, For the City Yet to Come: Changing African Life in Four Cities, Duke University Press, 2004, pp. 111–117.

External links 

 doual'art website
 doual'art on the New Museum art spaces directly

Art museums and galleries in Douala
Arts organizations based in Cameroon
1991 establishments in Cameroon
Art galleries established in 1991